Tamorot (ⵜⴰⵎⵓⵔⵓⵜ in Tamazight) is a small town and rural commune in Chefchaouen Province, Tanger-Tetouan-Al Hoceima, Morocco. At the time of the 2004 census, the commune had a total population of 24,541 people living in 3581 households.

Well incident
On 1 February 2022, a 5-year-old boy named Rayan, fell into a well of 32 meters deep. On 5 February it was announced Rayan was rescued out of the well, but later it was announced that he had died.

References

External links 

 [ Tamorot] in [ Geonames.org (cc-by)]

Populated places in Chefchaouen Province
Rural communes of Tanger-Tetouan-Al Hoceima